Nocardioides albertanoniae is a gram-positive, aerobic and non-spore-forming bacterium from the genus Nocardioides that has been isolated from green biofilm growing on a wall of the Domitilla Catacombs in Rome, Italy.

References

External links
Type strain of Nocardioides albertanoniae at BacDive -  the Bacterial Diversity Metadatabase	

albertanoniae
Bacteria described in 2013